The Wilson House is a historic house in Palo Alto, California. It was built in 1906. It was designed in the Colonial Revival architectural style. It has been listed on the National Register of Historic Places since January 2, 1980. According to the NRHP: "Almost two stories in height, it is, in terms of size, shape and quality among the finest residential example of its era in Palo Alto. The design is complex, the colors striking, and the rounded forms dictated by the bay are both unusual and difficult to execute. The workmanship is particularly well done."

References

Houses in Palo Alto, California
Houses on the National Register of Historic Places in California
National Register of Historic Places in Santa Clara County, California
Colonial Revival architecture in California
Houses completed in 1906
1906 establishments in California